Don't Explain is an album by jazz saxophonist Joel Frahm.

Background
Frahm and pianist Brad Mehldau had been friends since the age of 15.

Music and recording
The album was recorded in December 2001. The material consists of "six jazz standards, one familiar Ornette Coleman fixture, one memorable pop classic, and one original composition." "Mehldau, who functions as the entire rhythm section, alternates between being an accompanist, a soloist, and an equal part of the ensembles."

Reception
The Penguin Guide to Jazz described the overall result as "a very beautiful but slightly soporific album."

Track listing
"Don't Explain"
"Get Happy"
"Oleo"
"Round Midnight"
"Mother Nature's Son"
"East of the Sun"
"Turnaround"
"Away from Home"
"Smile"
"Round Midnight"

Personnel
 Joel Frahm – tenor sax, soprano sax
 Brad Mehldau – piano

References

2001 albums
Jazz albums by American artists
Palmetto Records albums